Thomas Atkinson was a warrant officer in the Royal Navy who served as master under Nelson and became one of the admiral's favoured followers. Nelson clearly thought highly of Atkinson, describing him as "One of the best Masters I have seen in the Royal Navy".

Early career and promotion to master
Born in Yorkshire in 1767, Atkinson joined the Royal Navy as a volunteer in 1793. Virtually nothing is known of him before this date but as he was immediately rated as an able seaman it is almost certain that he was already an experienced mariner. He was promoted to master two years later and joined , a 36-gun frigate. It was here Atkinson first came to the admiral's attention, serving under him during the unsuccessful expedition of 1797 against Santa Cruz de Tenerife.

HMS Theseus and the Battle of the Nile
While serving on board Theseus, Atkinson also saw action at Aboukir Bay in 1798 and Acre in 1799, when he was wounded in an explosion that damaged the ship and killed the captain, Ralph Miller. Atkinson was mentioned by Sir Sidney Smith in despatches, later published in the London Gazette, for his bravery in having contributed to the success of the battle and, along with other officers, saving the ship after Captain Miller was killed.

Service under Nelson
In 1801, Atkinson joined Nelson's new flagship, and began an almost uninterrupted spell of service under the admiral. This action gained him his first testimonial from Nelson who also became godfather to one of Atkinson's sons.

HMS Victory and Trafalgar
They served together until Nelson's death at the Battle of Trafalgar in 1805. At Nelson's funeral in 1806 Atkinson was present in the third barge. He was the only non-commissioned officer to be given that honour. Atkinson also accompanied the funeral car during the procession. A diagram was published in the London Gazette.

Later service
After Trafalgar, Atkinson served ashore in various naval dockyards, ending his career at Portsmouth as "first master attendant". He died in 1836 and was buried at St Andrew's churchyard in Farlington, Portsmouth, along with other members of his immediate family. 

Thomas Atkinson's obituary highlighted that "...the promotions and rewards he obtained were solely the result of his own perservering exertions".

References 

Royal Navy personnel of the French Revolutionary Wars
Royal Navy personnel of the Napoleonic Wars
Royal Navy sailors
Royal Navy officers
1767 births
1836 deaths
Cambrian Newspaper 25 June 1836; Death Notice. 
On the 10th inst., at his residence in H. M:s Dock-yard, Portsmouth, in his 69tb year, deeply lamented, Thos. Atkinson, Esq., First Master Attendant. He served as master of the Victory, at Trafalgar; and of the Theseus, at the Nile, under, and was a personal favourite with, the immortal Nelson, and for more than half a century was a brave, zealous, and experienced officer, and in society a kind-hearted, honest man.